(born 26 March 1917) is a Japanese fencer. He competed in the individual foil, épée and sabre events at the 1952 Summer Olympics.

References

External links
 

1917 births
Possibly living people
Japanese male épée fencers
Olympic fencers of Japan
Fencers at the 1952 Summer Olympics
Japanese male foil fencers
Japanese male sabre fencers